The Turkish Women's Cup (Turkish: Türkiye Kadınlar Kupası) is the annual cup competition of women's football teams in Turkey. The tournament is also known as Alanya Gold City Cup, as the tournament is held at the Gold City in Alanya, Turkey.

It is played in late February or early March, at the same time as the Algarve Cup, the Arnold Clark Cup, the Cup of Nations, the Cyprus Women's Cup, the Istria Cup, the Pinatar Cup, the SheBelieves Cup, the Tournoi de France and the Women's Revelations Cup.

Results
The list of finals:

Participating nations

 F Just played friendly matches.
 WD Withdrew

References

External links
 Women's football, TFF.org 
 
 

 
Turk
Cup
Women
International women's association football invitational tournaments
Recurring sporting events established in 2017